Shabnam Jahan is a Bangladeshi politician who is elected as Member of 11th Jatiya Sangsad of Reserved Seats for Women. She is a politician of Bangladesh Awami League. She is the incumbent General secretary of Bangladesh Mahila Awami League.

References

Living people
Awami League politicians
11th Jatiya Sangsad members
People from Dhaka District
21st-century Bangladeshi women politicians
1962 births
Women members of the Jatiya Sangsad